Kenneth Robert "Ken" Sitzberger (February 13, 1945 – January 2, 1984) was an American diver. After 4 years of Chicago Catholic League Champion at Fenwick High School, competing in the 3 m springboard he won a bronze medal at the 1963 Pan American Games and a gold at the 1964 Olympics. In 1964, Sitzberger was trailing the teammate Frank Gorman after nine of the ten dives, but Gorman performed poorly on his last dive, while Sitzberger was nearly flawless.

As a student at Indiana University, Sitzberger won the AAU national indoor 1-meter and 3-meter springboard championships in 1964 and 1965. He was the NCAA champion in the 1-meter from 1965 through 1967, and in the 3-meter springboard in 1966 and 1967.

Sitzberger married Jeanne Collier, who won an Olympic silver medal in the springboard in 1964. He worked for more than 16 years as a sports commentator for the American Broadcasting Company until his death at the age of 38. He died of a brain hemorrhage under mysterious circumstances. His wife said that he had fallen and hit his head on a table during a New Year's Eve party, and his death was ruled an accident. Police said Sitzberger twice picked fights with another man at the party, and in the second scuffle he struck his head. Because Sitzberger had been subpoenaed as a federal witness in a cocaine-trafficking case, police investigated his death further, but discovered no evidence of foul play. Ten years after his death, Sitzberger was inducted into the International Swimming Hall of Fame.

See also
 List of members of the International Swimming Hall of Fame

References

External links

1945 births
1984 deaths
Divers at the 1964 Summer Olympics
Olympic gold medalists for the United States in diving
Sportspeople from Cedar Rapids, Iowa
American male divers
Medalists at the 1964 Summer Olympics
Pan American Games bronze medalists for the United States
Pan American Games medalists in diving
Divers at the 1963 Pan American Games
Medalists at the 1963 Pan American Games